Lewis Jennings was an American gunsmith of 19th century who improved on the repeating rifle mechanism of Walter Hunt, but did not get any prominence among the armed forces.

References

Date of birth unknown
Date of death unknown
Gunsmiths
19th-century American people